In most English-speaking countries, varsity is an abbreviation of the word university. In the United States and Canada, the term is mostly used in relation to sports teams.

Varsity in the United Kingdom

In the United Kingdom, varsity team or varsity club refers to the groups participating in varsity matches in sport or other competitions between rival universities. The term originally referred strictly to university-sponsored teams, and dates from the 1840s. Varsity is a student newspaper at the University of Cambridge.

In contemporary Scots language the term varsity is often interchangeable with university  in contexts unrelated to sporting activity.

Varsity in North America
In the United States and Canada, varsity teams are the principal athletic teams representing a college, university, technical school, high school, junior high school, or middle school. Such teams compete against similar teams at corresponding educational institutions.  Groups of varsity sports teams are often organized into athletic conferences, which are groups of teams that regularly play each other during a given athletic season. In recognition of their high level of performance, athletes on varsity teams are often given varsity letters. They are in contrast to the institution's club sports.

A major difference between varsity and club sports is the source for allocated funds. Varsity teams receive financial support, equipment, and facilities from college and university athletic department budgets. Universities often allocate club sport budgets through student life departments similar to other clubs on campus. Because club sports cost more than other clubs, many club student-athletes must pay to play and also engage in team fundraising efforts to pay for facilities time, equipment, and other team expenses. At various levels of collegiate sports, varsity student athletes are eligible for scholarships solely or partially based on athletic skills.

Varsity can be compared with the junior varsity (JV) and freshman levels, the former which are typically for less-experienced underclassmen, while the latter which are usually for ninth graders in high school, and also with intramural sports (IM sports), for which the teams are all within the same school (the word intramural means "within the walls"). JV and IM players may be able to go up to varsity level by performing well.

Varsity in the Netherlands
In the Netherlands, the Varsity is the oldest and most prestigious rowing race. It was held for the first time in 1878, and was started as a Dutch equivalent for the Boat Race between Oxford and Cambridge.

Varsity in South Africa

In South Africa, New Zealand and some other Commonwealth countries, varsity simply means 'university' and is not necessarily related to sports.

Varsity in Bangladesh
Varsity is the short form of university in Bangladesh and is mostly used by the students of universities. The term is more common among students in large cities like Dhaka, Chittagong, Khulna, and Sylhet, though the term is now in wide use by many people outside of that demographic.

See also
Letterman (sports)
 Junior varsity
 Junior varsities

References 

Etymology
Student sport
Sports terminology
Student culture
Sports culture
Sports teams